is a passenger railway station  located in Higashinada-ku, Kobe, Hyōgo Prefecture, Japan. It is operated by the private transportation company Hanshin Electric Railway.

Lines
Only local trains stop at the station.

Layout
The station consists of two elevated opposed side platforms serving two tracks. There is only one ticket gate on the ground level.

Platforms

Gallery

History
Sumiyoshi Station opened on April 12, 1905 along with the rest of the Hanshin Main Line.

It was upgraded to an elevated station in 1929.

On January 17, 1995, the station was damaged by the Great Hanshin earthquake. Service in the affected area was restored by June 26, 1995.

Passenger statistics
In fiscal 2019, the station was used by an average of 1,489 passengers daily

Surrounding area
Sumiyoshi Park
Hakutsuru Sake Factory and Museum
Higashi Otomezuka Park
Kikumasa Sake Brewery
JR Sumiyoshi Station (approx 1 km)

See also
List of railway stations in Japan

References

External links

 Sumiyoshi Station website 

Railway stations in Japan opened in 1905
Railway stations in Kobe
Hanshin Main Line